Cadetactis is a monotypic genus of cnidarians belonging to the family Condylanthidae. The only species is Cadetactis elongata.

References

Condylanthidae
Hexacorallia genera
Monotypic cnidarian genera